Akkaya is a village in the Çukurca District in Hakkâri Province in Turkey. The village is populated by Kurds of the Alan tribe and had a population of 808 in 2022.

The four hamlets of Dağdibi, Sarıyer, Dikenli and Kunaklı are attached to Akkaya. Dikenli and Kunaklı are unpopulated.

History
Sārāspīdōn (today called Akkaya) was historically inhabited by Assyrian people and located in the Upper Tyari district in the Hakkari region. It had two churches and was served as part of the diocese of the Patriarch of the Church of the East. According to the English missionary George Percy Badger, the village was inhabited by 80 Assyrian families in 1850, all of whom belonged to the Church of the East and were served by two priests. Badger recorded that the villagers possessed 3000 sheep, 150 oxen, and 160 muskets; he also noted lead was mined at the village for use in the production of bullets. By 1877, the village's population had declined to 50 families with two priests when visited by Edward Lewes Cutts. Sārāspīdōn was destroyed by the Ottoman Army in June 1915 amidst the Sayfo.

Population 
Population history of the village from 2007 to 2022:

References
Notes

Citations

Bibliography

Kurdish settlements in Hakkâri Province
Historic Assyrian communities in Turkey
Places of the Assyrian genocide
Villages in Çukurca District